Bucculatrix sexnotata is a moth in the family Bucculatricidae. It is found in North America, where it has been recorded from California, Kentucky, Maine, New Brunswick, North Carolina, Nova Scotia, Ohio, Ontario, Pennsylvania and Quebec. It was described in 1927 by Annette Frances Braun.

References

Natural History Museum Lepidoptera generic names catalog

Bucculatricidae
Moths described in 1927
Moths of North America
Taxa named by Annette Frances Braun